Saptahik was a weekly tabloid published by Kantipur Publications in Nepal. It was one of the popular newspapers among youth in Nepal. It stopped publishing after Covid-19 hit the nation.

Editors 
Rajaram Gautam  is editor in chief of the Saptahik.

Other Notable staffs:

 Sujit Luintel
 Abhash Adhikari
 Mukunda Bogati
 Ramji Gyanwali
 Navaraj Wagle

References

Weekly newspapers
Newspapers published in Nepal
2000 establishments in Nepal